All Saints Church is in the village of Balterley, Staffordshire, England.  It is an active Anglican parish church in the deanery of Congleton, the archdeaconry of Macclesfield, and the diocese of Chester.  Its benefice is united with that of St Bertoline, Barthomley. The church is recorded in the National Heritage List for England as a designated Grade II listed building.

History

The church was built in 1901 to a design by the Lancaster firm of architects Austin and Paley.

Architecture

All Saints is constructed in brick with ashlar dressings, and has a red tiled roof.  Its architectural style is Gothic Revival.  The plan consists of a two-bay nave and a single-bay chancel in a single cell, a northeast vestry, a southwest porch, and a bellcote at the west end.  Buttresses externally mark the division between the nave and the chancel.  Along the sides of the church are three two-light windows.  The lateral windows have square heads.  The central windows are taller, and rise through the eaves forming dormers; they contain Decorated-style tracery.  The east window has three lights with Perpendicular tracery.  On the north side of the vestry is a three-light window and a door.  The bellcote has a gable surmounted by a cross finial.

Inside the church, the octagonal font is in marble with a small wooden cover.  The wooden pulpit is also octagonal.  The reredos is panelled, and is decorated with shields.

See also

Listed buildings in Balterley
List of ecclesiastical works by Austin and Paley (1895–1914)

References

Gothic Revival church buildings in England
Gothic Revival architecture in Staffordshire
Church of England church buildings in Staffordshire
Grade II listed churches in Staffordshire
Diocese of Chester
Austin and Paley buildings